The 1999–2000 Liga Bet season saw Tzeirei Nahf, Maccabi Ironi Tirat HaCarmel, Hapoel Herzliya and Hapoel Marmorek win their regional divisions and promoted to Liga Alef.

Second placed clubs, Hapoel Kafr Sumei, Hapoel Jaljulia and Maccabi Jerusalem/Ma'ale Adumim were also promoted, after several vacancies were created in Liga Alef.

At the bottom, Maccabi Givat HaRakafot (from North A division), Ironi Zikhron Ya'akov, Hapoel Barta'a, Maccabi Beit She'an (from North B division) and Hapoel Ar'ara (from South A division) were all automatically relegated to Liga Gimel.

North A division

North B division

South A division

Beitar Kfar Saba and Maccabi Bat Yam withdrew.

South B division

Beitar Ramla and Hapoel Eilat were suspended; Hapoel Be'er Ya'akov and Maccabi Shikun Hamizrah withdrew.

References
Israel Fifth Level 1999/2000 RSSSF

Liga Bet seasons
5
Israel